Faye S. Taxman, (born 1955) Doctor of Philosophy (Ph.D.) is a Criminology Professor at George Mason University (2009–present) in Northern Virginia, United States as well as a Director at the Center for Advancing Correctional Excellence! . Her work is better known for its influence on the redesign of aspects of the behavioural corrections system, specifically pertaining to the reduction of recidivism and mechanisms to achieve this such as offender rehabilitation. She is known to the general public for her novel, Implementing Evidence-Based Practices in Community Corrections and Addiction Treatment (Springer, 2011). Taxman received the 2017 Joan McCord Award for her work concerning Experimental Criminology and the 2015 Caron Foundation Award for Research of the Year. Within her present day line of employment, she is also an Affiliate Professor at the College of Medicine at Howard University, based in Washington, D.C. (2012–present) as well as Griffith University in Brisbane, Australia (2013–present).

Overview 
To date, Taxman has published in excess of 190 articles, among these is Tools of the Trade: A Guide to Incorporating Science into Practice (National Institute of Corrections, 2004). The guide outlines primarily the factors that contribute to criminal behaviour and the mechanism employed by correctional behaviour facilities for the prevention of offender recidivism. Of her most reputable works, Tools of the Trade: A Guide to Incorporating Science into Practice, Taxman outlines the process by which rehabilitation facilities can affect a decline in criminal behaviour. The article is segmented into the following sub sections:

 Attitude corrections

The publication advises offender correction facilities employ various techniques to redress criminal behaviour. Such techniques shall be evidenced through the actions of employees to accomplish the goals of the organisation and decrease the prominence of criminal-related issues. This section defines behavioural management as a construct affected by a number of factors: society, corrections, psychology and law. The chapter details a humanistic approach towards offenders, so as not to ostracise criminals and treat them as incapable of making meaningful contributions to society. In this, offenders must take an active role in the construction of their rehabilitation guidelines.

 Mechanisms for effective communication

According to Tools of the Trade, positive outcomes are more likely to arise when the offender is persuaded. As such, the examination process places strong emphasis on employee skills, specifically, communication and obtaining information relevant to the proper examination of offenders. Such information is then processed and used to construct “supervision plans” and “behavioural contracts”. In this, offenders receive constant feedback and have an obligation to improve their behaviour. This translates the goal of the offender rehabilitation and reduction of criminal recidivism into an actionable and measurable plan. Such an approach requires open and effective communication between employees and offenders at all times so as to provide the opportunity for individuals to adopt the appropriate skillset to recognise and redress behavioural deficiencies.

Within the correctional facilities workplace environment, this process is more formally referred to as “staff-offender contacts”. It is paramount such communications are unambiguous so as to streamline the achievement of mutual offender and employee goals. The interview-style discussion adheres to a semi-structure of: introduction, middle and summary. In this, the conversation remains primarily goal-orientated while maintaining adaptability to employee methods.

 Mechanisms to obtain information

In the attitude correction process, employees collate information concerning offenders under their guidance. Such information is sourced widely from “staff-offender contacts”, mandatory testing for illicit substances, polygraph test results and various monitoring systems such as electronic surveillance, Global Positioning Satellite systems and fingerprinting or biometric scanning. The advantage of such a wide source of information means employees almost always reserve the ability to pin point the location of offenders. Present day, the movement towards “community supervision” has taken the place of “office-based supervision”. This is based on indications interviews in the workplace environment neglect to provide employees with sufficient information required for the adequate supervision of criminals, specifically pertaining to high-risk offenders. In person meetings occur routinely, generally restricted to monthly or weekly sittings, therefore non optimal to the collation of offenders’ progress.

This constant monitoring enables behavioural correction employees to maintain a watchful-eye on the offender's reintegration into society and monitor whether or not the individual is acting in line with “supervision plans” and “behavioural contracts”. This allows staff to identify prominent members of offender's lives and foster appropriate employee-offender rapport. By extension of this, employees develop rapport with local home and business-owners who maintain the ability to a) offer information relevant to offenders and b) may be able to facilitate and support the offenders’ positive change. In this, both the community and technological surveillance as per the offenders’ risk level enables employees to adapt accordingly to counteract the recurrence of criminal behaviour.

 How to incentivise offenders

Given the extensive use of resources, information concerning noncompliance with conditions of parole, probation or rehabilitation is readily available for employees. By nature of the “behaviour management model”, there are specific sanctions or rewards in place for both violations and compliant actions. Sanctions and rewards serve as mechanisms to ensure offenders act in line with behavioural contracts. This form of incentivisation occurs across a spectrum that progressively limits offenders’ freedoms, placing restrictions based upon their respective lifestyle. Such limitations can manifest in the form of increased staff-offender contact and short- or long-term imprisonment. Noncompliance are offset by heavier impositions and phases of compliance are rewarded by a decrease in restrictions on daily activities. In facilitating positive progression, offenders are made aware of the actions that warrant rewards and sanctions.

 Categories of criminals

The degree to which offenders are supervised upon re-entering society is dependent upon their level of risk. Given this, criminals are classed according to the nature of their offence: aggressive and sex offenders, dealings in or use of illicit substances, white collar criminals and first-time offenders. However, all offenders must be supervised with respect to individual examination, communication, information and incentives. Proper examination method requires offenders be identified at the commencement of case planning. This ensures the correct guidelines are implemented based on the profile and description of the offender.

These Guiding Principles are testament to Taxman's well-researched title and heavy influence in the field of criminology.

Of her most recognised published works, Implementing Evidence-Based Practices in Community Corrections and Addiction Treatment (Springer, 2011), is now part of the Springer Series on Evidence-Based Crime Policy (SSEBCP). This novel offers a platform for evidence-based programs to be reintroduced and reapplied for the more adequate provision of justice in the real-world context. The novel outlines mechanisms for positive offender rehabilitation based on extensive research into internal factors within the organisation, for example, faculty development and management buy-in and external factors, including stakeholder commitment and the allocation of resources and funding. The novel creates an actionable and measurable framework to ensure the implementation of evidence-based strategy in operational agencies.

According to Taxman and co-writer, Belenko, factors influencing the effectiveness of outcomes pertaining to the behavioural corrections system are as follows:

 Part One

Taxman's novel is segmented into three parts, the first being the adaptability on the part of the broader community. This section of the novel is mostly concerned with the skills and resources of officers whom are entrusted to enforce the law within behavioural corrections facilities. This section questions the ability of officers to adopt various innovative structural frameworks based on readiness to adapt, learning capabilities and the goal-orientation of the organisation. Members of staff are required to be trained to a level deemed sufficient by the entity to ensure measurable achievement of organisational goals. This questions not only staff ability but overall success, insofar as the ability of the organisation to both train and retain employees as well as the commitment of staff to manifesting the vision of the organisation.

 Part Two

This section enquires into the progress of the organisation and how on track it is to achieve the intended outcome of the change. Here, Taxman and her co-writers link organisational success to commitment to its goals. Based on studies undergone to construct the text, it is concluded the overall ineffectiveness of goal implementation when the organisation demonstrated a lack of commitment to the integration of such innovations. Thus, organisational commitment to its vision and values is a mechanism to improve overall success. The process by which such outcomes are measured can be seen through a decline in offender recidivism and substance abuse.

 Part Three

In this section, Taxman and Belenko outline the mechanisms employed by an organisation to ensure the effective implementation of its goals and visions to innovate, counteract issues and engage in problem-solving behaviour. This is an ongoing methodology adopted for the overall enhancement of behavioural corrections systems. The process involves the monitoring of complaints on behalf of both officer and offenders and investigation into such complaints. Records must also be kept as issues arise as a means of measuring achievement goals. In addition, the organisation must prioritise issues based on merit and the overall level of their disruption to the organisations a) day-to-day life and culture and; b) goals and vision.

Educational background 
Taxman's interest in Criminal Justice can be seen throughout the timeline of her various studies. In 1977, Taxman graduated from the University of Tulsa in Oklahoma with Bachelor of Arts (with Honours). Shortly after, she continued her studies within the field of Arts, graduating Rutgers University in Newark, New Jersey from a Master of Arts (with Honours) in 1981. In 1982, Taxman attended the Rutgers University again to complete her Doctor of Philosophy and earn her Ph.D. title.

Academia and professional experience 
Taxman commenced work in 1977 as a Research Analyst for the Police Foundation, a non-profit organisation in many cities and states around the United States. However, her work within the field of Criminology began as she commenced her role as Research Assistant at Rutgers University (1978-1981).

This led to her role as acting director for the CJCC, otherwise referred to as the Criminal Justice Coordinating Commission. In this role, she monitored the administration of justice and the standard of law enforcement within the Montgomery County. From 1980 to 1981, she was employed by Rutgers University as an Adjunct Instructor, and soon after, as a Staff Associate within the field of Applied Management Sciences in 1983–1986. Between 1988 and 1991, Taxman worked her way upwards within the CJCC organisation, moving into her role formally referred to as deputy director. Onwards between 1991 and 1994, she was employed by the Institute for Law and Justice as Principal Associate. Between 1999 and 2004, Taxman was employed at BGR, more commonly referred to as the Bureau of Governmental Research at the University of Maryland as Director. Between 2004 and 2007, she was employed by the Virginia Commonwealth University within the position of Full Professor.

Present day, among other employment, within her main role as University Professor at George Mason University, Taxman teaches a number of criminology-related courses such as: Drugs and Crime, Justice Organisations and Administration, Corrections and Sentencing.

Awards and honours 
Taxman has been accredited a number of awards, her most recent being the Joan McCord Award granted by the American Society of Criminology. For research within her respective field, she was awarded the Caron Foundation Award for Research of the Year in 2015. She was also acknowledged to be among the most productive Criminology Scholars in the Journal of Criminal Justice Education. In 2013, Henriikka Weir and Erin Orrick recognised Taxman as one of The Most Prolific Female Scholars in Elite Criminology.

In 2013 again, Taxman was awarded the Ted Palmer and Rita Warren Differential Intervention Award and the Title of Distinguished Scholar within her respective fields of Sentencing and Corrections by the American Society of Criminology. For her work on Collaborative Behavioural Management to reduce Drug-Related Crimes and Substance-Abuse, she was awarded the Best Research Abstract Award in 2011 by AMERSA, more formally referred to as the Association for Medical Education and Research in Substance Abuse. In 2009, Tewksburt R. recognised Taxman among The Most Successful Criminal Justice Scholars and Departments in Research Grant Acquisition. For contributions to the field of Criminology, the Department of Public Safety and Correctional Services awarded Taxman the Dic2000.

References

Living people
American legal scholars
George Mason University faculty
University of Tulsa alumni
Rutgers University alumni
1955 births